In mathematical logic, proof compression by splitting is an algorithm that operates as a post-process on resolution proofs.  It was proposed by Scott Cotton in his paper "Two Techniques for Minimizing Resolution Proof".

The Splitting algorithm is based on the following observation:

Note that applying Splitting in a proof  using a variable  does not invalidates a latter application of the algorithm using a differente variable .

For achieving a better compression/time ratio, a heuristic for variable selection is desirable.

 

 

Then, define the map  on nodes in the resolution dag of :

Notes 

Proof theory